Ommata is a genus of beetles in the family Cerambycidae, containing the following species:

 Ommata andina Santos-Silva, Martins & Clarke, 2010
 Ommata buddemeyerae Clarke, 2010
 Ommata elegans White, 1855
 Ommata hirtipes Zajciw, 1965
 Ommata nigricollis Santos-Silva, Martins & Clarke, 2010
 Ommata tibialis Fuchs, 1961

References

Rhinotragini